The 47th Cuban National Series was won by the defending champion Santiago de Cuba over Pinar del Río, who made it to the finals despite an even regular season record. Santiago had the best regular season record along with La Habana, who lost in the first round.

Regular season standings

West

East

Playoffs

References

Cuban National Series seasons
Cuban National Series
Cuban National Series
Base